Willy Blain (born 24 April 1978) is a French boxer, best known to win the 2003 amateur world title in the Light Welterweight division.

Amateur
The southpaw won silver at the World Championships 1999, losing only to Uzbek Mahammatkodir Abdoollayev.
He represented his native country at two Summer Olympics, starting in 2000 in Sydney, Australia where he had a 1st round bye and immediately lost to Diógenes Luña (Cuba) 14-25.

His biggest achievement as an amateur was winning the world title at the 2003 World Amateur Boxing Championships in Bangkok, Thailand with a controversial final win over Alexander Maletin.

Olympic Results 2004
Defeated Mohamed Ali Sassi (Tunisia) 36-14
Defeated Alexandr Maletin (Russia) 28-20
Lost to eventual winner Manus Boonjumnong (Thailand) 8-20

Pro
Nicknamed "Small Leonard" he made his professional debut on November 16, 2004 in Germany against Francisco Gómez of Spain but showed little power and a bad chin so far.

External links
 News and Pictures of Willy Blain 
 

1978 births
Living people
Sportspeople from Réunion
Light-welterweight boxers
Boxers at the 2000 Summer Olympics
Boxers at the 2004 Summer Olympics
Olympic boxers of France
French male boxers
AIBA World Boxing Championships medalists

Mediterranean Games silver medalists for France
Competitors at the 2001 Mediterranean Games
Mediterranean Games medalists in boxing
21st-century French people